"Goodbye Amor" is the first CD-single by Annet Artani, released in summer 2005. The single includes three versions of "Goodbye Amor".

Track listing
"Goodbye Amor" (Album version)
"Goodbye Amor" (Instrumental)
"Goodbye Amor" (Kostas L.Sub Remix)

Charts

References

2005 singles
2005 songs
Annet Artani songs
Song articles with missing songwriters